is a former Japanese football player and manager. He played for Japan national team.

Club career
Sato was born in Yamagata Prefecture on April 15, 1951. After graduating from Chuo University, he joined Furukawa Electric in 1974. He debuted in 1976 and the club won Japan Soccer League and Emperor's Cup. The club also won 1985–86 Japan Soccer League, 1986 JSL Cup. He retired in 1988. He played 142 games in the league.

National team career
On July 21, 1978, Sato debuted for Japan national team against Malaysia.

Coaching career
After retirement, Sato started coaching career at Furukawa Electric (later JEF United Ichihara) in 1991 and he coached until 1994. In 1995, he moved to Shimizu S-Pulse. In 1996, he moved to Brummell Sendai and became a manager. In 1998, he signed with Urawa Reds and coached until 1999.

Club statistics

National team statistics

References

External links
 
 Japan National Football Team Database

1951 births
Living people
Chuo University alumni
Association football people from Yamagata Prefecture
Japanese footballers
Japan international footballers
Japan Soccer League players
JEF United Chiba players
Japanese football managers
Association football goalkeepers